The Air-Rail Link is a people mover linking Birmingham Airport with Birmingham International railway station and the National Exhibition Centre in England. The current system, originally known as SkyRail, replaced the earlier Birmingham Maglev system in 2003.

It takes passengers between  the high-level railway station concourse and the airport terminal buildings. It is free to use, and handles three million passengers per year. 

The Birmingham Maglev was opened in 1984 and was the first commercial Maglev transport system in the world. It operated up until 1995. The system was fully automated and used an elevated concrete guideway, much of which has been reused for the current Air-Rail Link system.

Maglev

Initial feasibility studies for a link from the airport to the railway station and exhibition centre were started in 1979 by the owners of the airport at that time, West Midlands County Council. The selected solution was based on experimental work commissioned by the British government at the British Rail Research Division laboratory at Derby. Contracts were awarded in 1981 to a consortium of GEC, Balfour Beatty, Brush Electrical Machines and Metro-Cammell under the name "People Mover Group", along with John Laing. The carriages were manufactured by Metro-Cammell at its Washwood Heath plant. The system was opened on 16 August 1984.

The line operated successfully for nearly eleven years, but obsolescence problems with the electronic systems, and a lack of spare parts, made it unreliable in its later years. The system last operated on 18 June 1995 after an investigation concluding the cost of reinstating and maintaining the Maglev to be too high. Initially the cars for the Maglev were stored by the airport owners, Birmingham International Airport Ltd., on the airport site.

A model of the Birmingham Maglev, together with one of the Maglev carriages (number 3), can be found in Locomotion in Shildon. A second carriage (number 1)  resides at Railworld. The third carriage (number 2) was put up for sale in an auction on eBay in late 2010 after lying unused at the airport since the system's closure. It was initially sold for £25,100, with the proceeds to go to two charities, but the bidder defaulted and it was resold to a private buyer near Kenilworth for just £100.

After closure, the original guideway lay dormant and a temporary shuttle bus service was operated until development of a suitable replacement was found. The guideway was reused in 2003 when the replacement cable hauled Air-Rail people mover was opened.

Cable Liner

The current Air-Rail Link is a cable-propelled shuttle system, using the Cable Liner technology from Doppelmayr Cable Car. The 585 m-long (1,921 ft) line takes travellers from the public transport interchange to the airport check-in in 90 seconds. The trains operate at a minimum headway of 120 seconds, consisting of a dwell time at each station of 30 seconds and a journey time of 90 seconds.

During the day, the trains run every few minutes each way. At off-peak times, trains operate on demand, and to facilitate this, a button labelled "DEMAND" must be pressed by the prospective passenger. The line is free to use, and handles three million passengers per year.

The Birmingham Airport Link was Doppelmayr Cable Car's first airport system and replaced the temporary bus service that had been operating since 1995. It is built on top of the previous Maglev guideway, slightly shortened by an extension of the railway station concourse to accommodate a low-level bus station. The replacement project was started on 30 March 2001 and completed on 7 March 2003 with the first day of public operation. The project contract cost £11 million. The new system has motivated passengers travelling to the airport to leave their cars at home and use public transport.

See also
 Link Train, a 7-car long airport system using the same technology in Toronto, Canada
 Airport Shuttle Mexico, airport system using the same technology in Mexico
 Free public transport

References

External links

Air-Rail Link, Birmingham Airport.
Photograph of a Birmingham Maglev car on Flickr

Airport people mover systems in the United Kingdom
Cable Liner people movers
Driverless Maglev
Transport in Birmingham, West Midlands
Solihull
Linear induction motors
Cable car railways in the United Kingdom
1984 establishments in England